Ingram Entertainment Inc. is an American distributor of home entertainment products, like DVDs, audiobooks, video game software and hardware. Ingram Entertainment Inc, is the nation's largest distributor of DVD software.

History
The company has 14 locations in the United States and offer services to video game stores, video game and electronic stores, supermarkets, drugstores, and internet retailers.  Ingram Entertainment Holdings Inc. had total revenues of $616 million in 2010 processing approximately 100 million units of DVD and video game software. The company has an affiliates: video distributor Monarch Home Video.

Assets
On January 11, 2019, Ingram purchased the music & video retail sales division and assets of Charlotte, North Carolina, based book distributor Baker & Taylor. Terms of the deal were not disclosed.

Monarch Home Entertainment was created in 1989 by Ingram Entertainment.

Ingram Entertainment sold beverage distributor DBI Beverage to Reyes Beverage Group in 2019.

References

External links
 Ingram Entertainment page

Home video distributors
Ingram family
American corporate subsidiaries